Joan Dukes (died April 6, 2020) was an American politician who served as a member of the Oregon State Senate from the 1st and 16th districts from 1987 to 2005, representing northwest Oregon. She was a member of the Democratic Party.

Career 

Dukes worked as Clatsop County Elections Supervisor from 1981 to 1983.  She then served a term on the Clatsop County board of commissioners from 1983 to 1987. Dukes was elected to Oregon's 1st Senate district in 1986 and was reelected in 1990, 1994, and 1998. In 2002, she was redistricted into Oregon's 16th Senate district and won reelection there.

In the Senate, Dukes advocated for a diverse set of issues, including transportation, pain management, and commercial fishing.

Dukes resigned from the Senate in 2005, after being appointed to the Northwest Power and Conservation Council by Governor Ted Kulongowski. At the time of her resignation, she was the Oregon Senate's longest-serving current member.

References 

20th-century births
2020 deaths
Democratic Party Oregon state senators
Women state legislators in Oregon
Politicians from Tacoma, Washington
Year of birth missing
People from Clatsop County, Oregon